The 2002 V-League season was the 46th season of Vietnam's professional football league.

The bottom side at the end of the season get relegated. The side that finishes 2ND from bottom enters an end of season play-off match against the 2nd Division's 2nd placed side.

Statistics of the V-League in the 2001–02 season.

League table

References

 2001–02 V-League at RSSSF

Vietnamese Super League seasons
Vietnam
1
1